Wanda Wiktoria Półtawska (born 2 November 1921 in Lublin) is a Polish physician and author. She was a victim of the Ravensbrück concentration camp, just north of Berlin, having been arrested in February 1941 and charged with assisting the Polish resistance movement. She was used as a human guinea pig and became the subject of various medical experiments. She spent four years in the camp and afterwards wrote an account of her experiences, And I Am Afraid of My Dreams. She later married and had four children.

Her memoir of the life and conditions for the women held in the camp has provided material for other books such as Ravensbrück : The Cell Building by Insa Eschebach. She had decided during her incarceration that if she survived she would become a doctor, and this is what she did. She completed her medical studies at the Jagiellonian University in 1951 and obtained her doctorate in psychiatry in 1964. She conducted research on the so-called "Auschwitz children", people who had endured the concentration camps as children. In 1967 she organized the establishment of the Institute of Family Theology at the Pontifical Academy of Theology in Kraków and managed it for 33 years. Between 1981 and 1984 she was a lecturer at the Pontifical Lateran University in Rome.

Półtawska is a staunch Roman Catholic, and collaborated with her compatriot Pope John Paul II, influencing him on such topics as contraception and sexuality. When, in 1962, Półtawska was ill with cancer and told she had only 18 months to live, the monk Padre Pio was asked by the Pope, then Bishop Wojtyła, to pray for Półtawska. After this her cancerous growth allegedly disappeared and she no longer needed an operation to remove it. This was one of the miracles that led the Pope to canonise Padre Pio in 2002.

References

Polish psychiatrists
Polish women psychiatrists
Home Army members
Polish women physicians
Writers from Lublin
Recipients of the Order of Polonia Restituta
Jagiellonian University alumni
Ravensbrück concentration camp survivors
Polish women in World War II resistance
Polish Roman Catholics
Polish centenarians
Women centenarians
1921 births
Living people
Academic staff of the Pontifical Lateran University